The Raiders Drum & Bugle Corps is an Open Class competitive junior drum and bugle corps. Based in Burlington, New Jersey. The Raiders perform in Drum Corps International (DCI) competitions.

History
''Source:

The Raiders Drum and Bugle Corps was founded in 1990 by George Lavelle, Jr. with George Lavelle Sr., Trent Smith, Clarence Jackson, and Anthony Bestreski joining as members of the initial board of directors. The intent was to provide the opportunity for young people to march in a highly competitive drum corps at an economical cost.

After a year of planning and preparation, the Raiders took the field on June 22, 1991 with a corps of 25 members, defeating two of the other three Division II/III corps in the show. Marching a schedule of local DCI and Garden State Circuit (GSC) shows, the Raiders finished the season by taking second place in the GSC.

The corps' second season saw a growth of nearly 100% and a tour to Ohio, Iowa, and the DCI Division III Championship prelims in Whitewater, Wisconsin, where the corps placed 19th among 29 corps.

In 1993, the corps again grew in numbers and moved to Division II. The Raiders won the first of seven GSC titles that year and finished 15th of 15 corps at DCI Division II Championships in Jackson, Mississippi. The corps marched DII only two more years, finishing placing 14th of 18 corps at DCI  in Lowell, Massachusetts in 1994 and 11th of 13 corps at DCI in Buffalo, New York in 1995.

The Raiders board made the decision to return to DIII in 1996 in order to cut expenses. This move paid off immediately, when the corps made finals and placed 7th of 31 corps at the DCI DIII Championships in Orlando, Florida. Over the following eleven years, the Raiders would make the DCI DIII Finals nine times and, in 2005, win the DCI Division III World Championship.

2005 DCI Division III World Champions.

In 2007, the Raiders moved back to Division II, placing 6th at the DCI Championships in Pasadena, California.

DCI combined Divisions II and III into Open Class in 2007, and the Raiders have been a finalist every year since, except 2018, placing as high as fifth at Michigan City (prelims) and Indianapolis, Indiana (semis & finals) in 2010.

Sponsorship

The Raiders Drum & Bugle Corps is a program of A+ Education and Performing Arts, a registered non-profit 501(c)(3) musical organization. The corps' Executive Director is Bob Gupta.

Show summary (1992–2022) 

Source:

Traditions

The corps song is "One More Time", which is sung by the entire corps just before taking the field.

References

External links

Official website

Drum Corps International Open Class corps
Musical groups established in 1990
1990 establishments in New Jersey